Alliance Defending Freedom (ADF, formerly Alliance Defense Fund) is an American conservative Christian legal advocacy group that works to curtail rights for LGBTQ people; expand Christian practices within public schools and in government; and outlaw abortion. ADF is headquartered in Scottsdale, Arizona, with branch offices in Washington, D.C. and New York, among other locations. The global arm, Alliance Defending Freedom International, which is headquartered in Vienna, Austria, operates in over 100 countries.

ADF is one of the most organized and influential Christian legal interest groups in the United States based on its budget, caseload, network of allied attorneys, and connections to significant members of the political right. These include U.S. Supreme Court Justice Amy Coney Barrett and high-ranking Republicans such as former vice president Mike Pence, former attorneys general William Barr and Jeff Sessions, and US Senator from Missouri Josh Hawley (husband of ADF senior counsel Erin Hawley). ADF attorneys have argued a number of cases before the Supreme Court, including cases about religion in public schools, the Affordable Care Act, the legalization of same-sex marriage, business owners' right to not provide services for same-sex marriages, and prayers before town meetings. They also wrote the model legislation for Mississippi's anti-abortion legislation, making them significant players in Dobbs v. Jackson Women's Health Organization, the decision that overruled the fifty-year-old precedent case Roe v. Wade establishing the right to abortion.

The Southern Poverty Law Center (SPLC) designates ADF as an anti-LGBT hate group, describing it as "one of the most influential groups forming the Trump administration's attack on LBGTQ rights." The ADF has taken many anti-LGBT legal positions, such as opposition to  same-sex marriage and decriminalization of same-sex sexual activity, and the prohibition of discrimination based on sexual orientation and gender identity.

History and structure

Founding

The Alliance Defense Fund, now known as the Alliance Defending Freedom, was founded by members of the evangelical  Christian right movement to prevent what its founders saw as threats to religious liberty in American society. ADF was incorporated in 1993  by six conservative Christian men. The co-founders were Bill Bright, who also founded Campus Crusade for Christ; Larry Burkett, an evangelical financial advisor; James Dobson, founder of Focus on the Family; D. James Kennedy, founder of Coral Ridge Ministries; Marlin Maddoux, a Christian radio personality; and Alan Sears, former director of the Meese Commission.

The ADF's first president, CEO and Chief Counsel was Alan Sears. Sears has been described as "an ardent antipornography crusader," and had previously served as staff executive director of the Reagan administration Attorney General's Commission on Pornography, which produced the 1986 Meese Report.

In its early years, Alliance Defense Fund funded legal cases rather than litigating directly. It particularly targeted the work of the American Civil Liberties Union, which its founders saw as contributing to an erosion of Christian values.

Principal concerns of the ADF have been outlawing abortion and opposing gay rights. Several founding members wrote books condemning homosexuality, including longtime president Alan Sears (The Homosexual Agenda) and Marlin Malloux (Answers to the Gay Deception). Evangelist pastor D. James Kennedy described same-sex marriage as "counterfeit marriage" and was a proponent of conversion therapy "for homosexuals who want to change, through the power of Jesus Christ." James Dobson's Focus on the Family founded a ministry called  Love Won Out to convince people that homosexuality is a sin and that same-sex attraction could be "overcome."

Shift to direct litigation
The Alliance Defense Fund changed its name to Alliance Defending Freedom on July 9, 2012. The name change was intended to reflect the organization's shift in focus from funding allied attorneys to directly litigating cases. By 2014 the organization had more than 40 staff attorneys, and had "emerged as the largest legal force of the religious right, arguing hundreds of pro bono cases across the country.". The ADF garnered national attention in its 2014 challenge to the Affordable Care Act. In Burwell v. Hobby Lobby Stores, Inc., the Court ruled that the birth control mandate in employee funded health plans was unconstitutional since there existed a less restrictive means of furthering the law’s interest.

The Southern Poverty Law Center listed the organization as an extremist anti-LGBTQ hate group in 2016. The group's designation "was a judgment call that went all the way up to top leadership at the SPLC." According to the SPLC, the ADF was included on the list due to the group's filing of an amicus brief in the 2003 U.S. Supreme Court case Lawrence v. Texas, in which the ADF expressed support for upholding the state's right to criminalize consensual sexual acts between people of the same sex. The SPLC has described the ADF as "virulently anti-gay." The SPLC describes the group's mission as "making life as difficult as possible for LGBT communities in the U.S. and internationally." The ADF has opposed its inclusion on the SPLC's list, with senior counsel Jeremy Tedesco describing it as "a stranglehold on conservative and religious groups that is just hovering over us and that can continue to constrict and limit our ability to simply voice our opinion."

In July 2017, U.S. sitting Attorney General Jeff Sessions attended ADF's Summit on Religious Liberty. Sessions said, "While your clients vary from pastors to nuns to geologists, all of us benefit from your good work." LGBTQ rights groups criticized Sessions for his participation at the event. Dominic Holden wrote in BuzzFeed News that ADF's growing influence within the federal government can be attributed to Sessions' support.

Leadership and international expansion
In January 2017, Michael Farris, the founder of Patrick Henry College, became the new CEO of ADF. Farris lobbied Congress for the passage of the Religious Freedom Restoration Act of 1993. Farris has called the SPLC's designation a "troubling smear" and "slander."  
	
After Donald Trump lost the 2020 presidential election and refused to concede while making claims of fraud, Farris worked behind the scenes on legal documents filed by Texas attorney general Ken Paxton to overturn the election results. On October 1, 2022, Kristen Waggoner succeeded Farris as CEO and President of ADF, retaining her role as General Counsel.

Since 2010, ADF's global arm, ADF International, has been increasingly politically active in countries around the world. ADF International reported 580 "ongoing legal matters" in 51 countries as of 2017, and increased spending in the EU alone from less than $2 million in 2019 to over $10 million in 2020–2021. In India, the organization has an affiliate group, Alliance Defending Freedom India (ADF India), headquartered in Delhi.

Finances and donors
ADF is a tax-exempt 501(c)(3) organization. In 2021, ADF reported nearly $79 million dollars in revenue, an increase of over 20% since 2020, when revenue was $65 million. ADF's net assets increased to $57 million, an increase of 33% over its net assets in 2020. Prior to the 2020–21 financial year, revenue and net assets had remained fairly steady since 2015. Since 1999, ADF's budget has increased almost nine-fold, from $9 million that year. 

In 2020, ADF founder Alan Sears was compensated over $803,000 and President Michael Farris was compensated $455,000. In 2021, Farris made $503,000 and Sears $486,000, while the current President,  CEO, and General Counsel, Kristen Waggoner, was compensated $337,000.

The Servant Foundation, a Christian grant-making organization, is a significant funder of the Alliance Defending Freedom. The foundation donated over $50 million to the Alliance Defending Freedom between 2018 and 2020, via the foundation's financial arm, The Signatry.

Other donors include the Covenant Foundation, the Bolthouse Foundation, the Edgar and Elsa Prince Foundation, the Richard and Helen DeVos Foundation, and the Bradley Foundation. The Charles Koch Institute donated $275,000 to ADF in 2020. The M.J. Murdock Charitable Trust, one of largest charities in the Pacific Northwest, donated nearly $1 million to ADF from 2007 to 2016.

In the European Union, ADF International spending was about $2 million per year (£1.5 million) in 2019, including about $560,000 on lobbying EU . As of 2020-2021, ADF International had a $11.5 million USD (€9.5 million) budget for EU activities.

Positions and litigation

While the ADF states that it works to promote freedom of religion and that it is "not a political organization," it is explicitly Christian; employees of ADF must profess "adherence to the inspired, infallible, inerrant, and authoritative Word of God in Scripture." Moreover, its stated mission is to "keep the door open for the gospel" by seeking to bring United States law in line with their Christian beliefs.

Religion in public institutions
One of ADF's goals is for Christianity to be written into the US legal system, based on their interpretation of the U.S. Constitution. In materials they share with donors, ADF says that they seek to spread a belief in "the framers' original intent for the US Constitution and the Bill of Rights as it reflects God's natural law and God's higher law."

The organization also pursues "other strategies for reclaiming the judicial system as it was originally envisioned," most notably through litigation. The ADF has been involved in several United States Supreme Court cases regarding the use of public buildings and public funds for religious purposes, including Rosenberger v. University of Virginia (1995), Good News Club v. Milford Central School (2001), and Town of Greece v. Galloway (2014).  ADF supports Christian prayer at public town meetings (see Town of Greece v. Galloway, 2014) and the use of religious displays (such as crosses and other religious monuments) in public buildings and on public lands. ADF has argued that parents with religious objections should have the right to opt their children out of sex education in schools. The organization supports cases supporting religious practice in public schools, for example, in Good News Club v. Milford Central School (2001) the ADF was part of a case in which the Supreme Court ruled that religious clubs must be afforded equal access to school facilities.

Opposition to LGBTQ rights
In 2003, ADF unsuccessfully called for the recriminalization of homosexual acts, in the U.S., filing a Supreme Court brief supporting Texas' sodomy law in the landmark Lawrence v. Texas case which declared sodomy laws unconstitutional; it opposed laws that would protect people from discrimination based on sexual orientation and gender identity; and it falsely linked homosexuality to pedophilia. ADF also opposes same-sex marriage and civil unions, as well as adoption by same-sex couples, based on its leaders' "belief that God created men, women, and families such that children thrive best in homes with a married mother and father." ADF provided legal support to the defendants in two Supreme Court cases dealing with the intersection of freedom of religion against Colorado's anti-discrimination laws for public-serving businesses, Masterpiece Cakeshop v. Colorado Civil Rights Commission (2018) and 303 Creative LLC v. Elenis (2022); in both cases, the underlying issue was whether Christian business owners, under the anti-discrimination law, were compelled to create works with LGBT messaging that they said went against their Christian faith. In 2021, the Supreme Court declined to consider an appeal from ADF attorneys on behalf of a florist who refused to serve her clients' same-sex wedding, with three of the nine justices indicating they were willing to hear the case.

The organization has also worked internationally to prevent decriminalization of homosexuality in Jamaica and Belize. The SPLC has reported on ADF support for a law criminalizing same-sex sexual acts in Belize (ruled unconstitutional in 2016). The ADF denied playing any role in the case. In the United Kingdom, ADF International advocated in favor of a mother's custody of her child, against the custody of the child's father and his same-sex partner. ADF also has links to the former prime minister of Australia,  Tony Abbott, an outspoken opponent of the legalization of same-sex marriage in Australia. Abbott gave a speech to ADF regarding marriage in 2016.

ADF opposes transgender rights based on an idea that "God creates each person with an immutable biological sex — male or female..." The organization has litigated against transgender employment protections, access to bathrooms, and participation in sports for transgender people.  Members of ADF also authored model legislation for bathroom bills in the United States, aimed at restricting transgender people's use of public bathrooms. In 2020, the ADF lost a Supreme Court case in which they argued that employers should be allowed to discriminate against transgender people. ADF attorneys defended a funeral home that fired a trans employee in the Supreme Court case, R.G. & G.R. Harris Funeral Homes Inc. v. Equal Employment Opportunity Commission, losing in a 6–3 vote.

The organization has worked to prevent transgender children from playing sports, through lawsuits and by lobbying state legislatures. In April 2022, ADF-affiliated lawyers defended a professor at Shawnee State University, Ohio, who refused to use preferred pronouns when referring to a transgender student; the university agreed to a $400,000 settlement with the professor.

In Europe, ADF International has supported mandatory genital surgery and sterilization  of transgender people before they are allowed to change the gender marker on government IDs.  However, a decision by the European Court of Human Rights, A.P., Garçon and Nicot v. France, has led France, Greece, Portugal, and several other countries to allow non-medical pathways to gender marker change.

In June 2022 several groups opposing trans rights, including Alliance Defending Freedom, WDI USA, Family Research Council and Women's Liberation Front, organized an anti-trans rally in Washington D.C. According to Lindsay Schubiner, director of an Oregon non-profit organization which aims to counter right-wing extremism, white nationalists have attempted "to exploit the current increased focus on spreading homophobia and transphobia on the broader right and institutional environments" to appeal to and recruit mainstream conservatives.

Opposition to abortion, birth control, and euthanasia
ADF actively opposes the right to abortion and euthanasia, and has litigated to restrict access to contraception in the US and in other countries. 

In the 2022 decision Dobbs v. Jackson Women's Health Organization, the Supreme Court upheld a Mississippi law that was the nation’s first-ever 15-week abortion ban, thereby overturning  Roe v. Wade (1973) and Planned Parenthood v. Casey (1992). The Mississippi law was based on ADF’s model legislation, specifically designed to provoke a legal challenge that would be appealed to the ultraconservative Fifth Circuit Court of Appeals, and then to the Supreme Court. That strategy succeeded in ending the legal right to abortion in the United States, and giving states the power to restrict or ban medical care related to pregnancy termination. The ADF has links to at least one Justice of the Supreme Court, Amy Coney Barrett.

The ADF also represents the Alliance for Hippocratic Medicine in Alliance for Hippocratic Medicine v. US Food and Drug Administration, a case where the plaintiff has challenged the U.S Food and Drug Agency's longstanding approval of mifepristone, a drug frequently used in medical abortion procedures.

Another of its most notable legal battles was a 2014 case challenging the Affordable Care Act. In Burwell v. Hobby Lobby Stores, Inc., the Court ruled that the birth control mandate in employee-funded health plans when the company is "closely-held" was unconstitutional. The case set a precedent for allowing corporations and individuals to make religious claims for exemption from laws and regulations based on a religious freedom argument.  The United States Supreme Court held that privately held corporations could be exempt from Affordable Care Act regulations if the owners asserted religiously objections, basing the decision on the Religious Freedom Restoration Act of 1993. The decision meant that many employers could decide not to cover contraceptives through their health insurance plans.

International anti-abortion work
ADF has led an international campaign to influence and restrict the right to abortion.  The organization takes the position that healthcare workers have a right to refuse to provide care for abortion and other practices the individual finds morally objectionable. ADF has backed anti-abortion causes in Ireland, El Salvador, Colombia, Poland and Sweden. In the United Kingdom, the group has campaigned against buffer zones around abortion clinics.

In Sweden, a midwife, Ellinor Grimmark, sued the province of Jönköping for discrimination because she was refused employment when, citing "freedom of conscience,” she refused to give morning-after pills, perform abortions, or put in copper IUDs. She lost both her hearing before the Discrimination Ombudsman, and at the Jönköping district court. The proceedings in the Labor Court of Sweden began on January 24, 2017, and her case received both legal and financial aid from ADF. Grimmark’s legal representative, Ruth Nordström, was a registered partner of ADF, and both Grimmark and Nordström participated in ADFs marketing films. Nordström co-wrote an opinion piece opposing abortion rights with an ADF representative for  Sveriges Television, Sweden's national public television broadcaster.

Campaigns against assisted suicide 
The ADF has campaigned against the legalization of voluntary euthanasia in the United Kingdom.  The group has also challenged the right to euthanasia in Belgium, before the European Court of Human Rights. ADF India also campaigns against assisted suicide and euthenasia.

Christian adoption agency's rejection of Jewish applicants
In 2022, ADF took on a case defending a Tennessee-based Christian adoption agency that refused to work with Jewish prospective parents. The case, which names the State of Tennessee as a defendant for its law permitting religious organizations to reject applicants based on faith, was dismissed on technical grounds. As of late July 2022, the case is being appealed to the Tennessee Court of Appeals on behalf of the couple and several other plaintiffs.

Commenting on an earlier case in South Carolina, an ADF spokesperson expressed support for an evangelical foster care provider in South Carolina that rejects Jewish prospective parents, as well as LGBTQ people, atheists, and other non-Christians. The agency, Miracle Hill Ministries, is the largest foster and adoption agency in South Carolina and receives public funding; its President has stated that its religious discrimination policy is justified, because “We look like a social service agency, but we’re a community of Christ followers and our faith in Christ is the most important part of who we are."  A Catholic woman sued the agency after being rejected on the basis of religion, but the agency later changed its rules to permit "Catholics who affirm Miracle Hill's doctrinal statement in belief and practice to serve as foster parents and employees."

At the request of South Carolina governor Henry McMaster, the Trump administration granted the organization a waiver of federal non-discrimination law. An ADF spokesperson indicated that the organization is "grateful [to] HHS and South Carolina" for granting the waiver, which allows the agency to continue to restrict fostering and adoption work to those who endorse evangelical beliefs.

COVID-19 anti-vaccination and anti-lockdown cases
ADF has opposed government measures aimed to stop the spread of COVID-19 in the United States and in other countries. In the US, ADF partnered with The Daily Wire in a legal challenge against the Biden administration's OSHA vaccine mandate. In Uganda, ADF joined a Texas libertarian organization in backing a campaign to end restrictions on large gatherings that the government had implemented to reduce COVID-19 spread. ADF brought legal challenges against the Ugandan government's regulations on large gatherings. In Scotland, ADF fought against COVID-19 regulations on large gatherings, claiming that the measures were unfair to religious groups. The ADF-backed lawsuit won in Scotland's high court. A poll commissioned by the Humanist Society showed that more than three-quarters of Scots were opposed to the church's reopening and the Church of Scotland distanced itself from the legal action, saying that they accepted measures to prevent COVID-19 spread.

Non-profit donor disclosure
In the US Supreme Court decision Americans for Prosperity Foundation v. Bonta (2021), ADF argued that non-profits should not be required to disclose the identities of their donors on California state tax returns. In a victory for ADF, the court struck down the disclosure law as unconstitutional.

Other activities

Blackstone Legal Fellowship

Blackstone Legal Fellowship, named after the English jurist William Blackstone, is ADF's summer legal training program. It was founded in 2000 for the purpose of preparing Christian law students for professional legal careers. The first class comprised 24 interns. The program is made up of interns, called Fellows, from a diverse selection of law schools as well as elite institutions such as Harvard and Yale. Amy Coney Barrett, who went on to be Associate Justice of the Supreme Court of the United States, was a paid speaker at Blackstone on five occasions between 2013 and 2017.

Public campaigns 
In 2003 the ADF launched the "Christmas Project," aiming to discourage non-Christian holidays from being celebrated and to promote Christmas celebrations in public schools. The annual initiative was organized in an effort to prevent school districts from holding secular holiday celebrations, or what the organization called the "censorship of Christmas." In its press release ADF singled out the American Civil Liberties Union as the chief target of the campaign. By 2004, the organization had contacted 3,600 school districts to inform them that they were not required by the Constitution to have holiday celebrations inclusive of all religions.

In 2005 the ADF and Focus on the Family began sponsoring a counter-protest called the Day of Truth (later called "Day of Dialogue") to oppose the annual Day of Silence, an annual event to promote awareness of anti-LGBT bullying and harassment in schools. The ADF asserted that 1,100 students from 350 schools participated in ADF's event, which ADF billed as a response to the "homosexual agenda."

Church political activity and tax exemption

In 2008, ADF launched the first Pulpit Freedom Sunday to promote political messaging and endorsements in Christian pastors' sermons in defiance of the prohibition on political endorsements by non-profit 501(c)(3) organizations under the 1954 Johnson Amendment.  The practice of political endorsement is not broadly accepted within the evangelical community, with most Evangelical pastors opposed as of 2017.

Pulpit Freedom Sunday is an initiative aimed to overturn the Johnson Amendment, which restricts political campaigning by tax-exempt non-profit organizations, which includes most churches. According to The New York Times, ADF's campaign is "perhaps its most aggressive effort." In the first year about 35 pastors participated, in what they consider an act of civil disobedience, endorsing political candidates in their sermons and defying the Internal Revenue Service regulations. In Minnesota, reverend Gus Booth encouraged his congregation to vote for John McCain rather than Barack Obama. , participation in the event had grown to about 1,800 pastors. The IRS indicated that it would increase enforcement of the Johnson Amendment.

Some opponents of the movement have voiced concern about permitting churches to endorse politicians because it would allow political donors to remain anonymous and to get tax breaks for their donations. Unlike other non-profits, churches aren’t required to make financial disclosures, so churches endorsing politicians could act as funnels for anonymous campaign donations, or "dark money."

Associated people
The following people are currently or have been affiliated or associated with ADF:

 Tony Abbott, former prime minister of Australia
 William Barr, former US Attorney General under George H. W. Bush and Donald Trump, ADF Award recipient in 2021
 Amy Coney Barrett, Associate Justice of the U.S. Supreme Court, paid speaker at Blackstone Legal Fellowship
 Lisa Biron, New Hampshire lawyer associated with ADF, convicted of manufacturing and possessing child pornography
 Bill Bright founder of Campus Crusade for Christ and ADF
 J. Budziszewski, professor, member of Advisory Board of Blackstone
 Larry Burkett founder of Crown Financial Ministries and ADF
 Paul Coleman, Executive Director of ADF International
 Chapman B. Cox, former General Counsel of the United States Department of Defense, ADF chairman emeritus
 Marjorie Dannenfelser, president of the Susan B. Anthony List and member of ADF Board
 James Dobson founder of Focus on the Family and ADF
  Kyle Duncan, judge appointed by Trump to the Fifth Circuit Court of Appeals, speaker for ADF in 2007, 2008, and 2009
 Michael Farris, president and CEO from 2017 to 2022
 David A. French, former journalist at National Review, former Senior Counsel at ADF, who became senior editor of The Dispatch
 Robert P. George, legal scholar, member of Blackstone Advisory Board
 Mary Ann Glendon, former U. S. Ambassador to the Holy See, member of Blackstone Advisory Board
 Erin Hawley, ADF senior counsel (spouse of Senator Josh Hawley)
 Josh Hawley, U.S. Senator for Missouri, former member of Blackstone Fellowship (spouse of Erin Hawley)
 Mike Johnson, former ADF attorney, member of U.S. House of Representatives (Louisiana)
 Michael J. Juneau, judge of the U.S. District Court, Western District of Louisiana
 D. James Kennedy founder of Coral Ridge Ministries and ADF
 Charles LiMandri, attorney associated with the Mount Soledad Cross lawsuits
 Marlin Maddoux president, International Christian Media and ADF founder
 Edwin Meese, former Attorney General of the United States, member of Blackstone Advisory Board
 Mike Pence, former Vice President of the United States; appointed former ADF President Michael Farris to his Advancing American Freedom Advisory Board
 William Pew, co-founder of ADF
 Charles W. Pickering, former judge for the Fifth Circuit Court of Appeals, ADF Board member
 Charles E. Rice, legal scholar, member of Blackstone Advisory Board
 Allison Jones Rushing, judge of the Fourth Circuit Court of Appeals
 Andrew Sandlin, Christian minister, faculty member at Blackstone
 Alan Seabaugh, member of Louisiana legislature, ADF-allied attorney
 Alan Sears, attorney, and founder and first president and CEO of ADF
 Jeff Sessions, former U.S. Attorney General under Donald Trump and U.S. Senator for Alabama
 Ken Starr, judge and independent counsel in Clinton impeachment, member of ADF’s Supreme Court Advisory Council
 Kristen Waggoner, ADF President and CEO as of 2022
 Doug Wardlow, former Minnesota legislator, former lawyer at ADF

See also

Legal groups
 American Center for Law and Justice
 Center for Individual Rights
 Christian Legal Society
 Liberty Counsel

Related legislation
 First Amendment Defense Act
 Marriage Protection Amendment

Other
 Christian Nationalism

References
Notes

Further reading

External links
 
 

1993 establishments in the United States
 
Anti-abortion organizations in the United States
Christian nationalism
Civil liberties advocacy groups in the United States
Conservative organizations in the United States
Intelligent design movement
Legal advocacy organizations in the United States
Non-profit organizations based in Arizona
Organizations established in 1993
Organizations that oppose LGBT rights in the United States
Organizations that oppose transgender rights
Political organizations based in the United States